In computer graphics, a line drawing algorithm is an algorithm for approximating a line segment on discrete graphical media, such as pixel-based displays and printers. On such media, line drawing requires an approximation (in nontrivial cases). Basic algorithms rasterize lines in one color. A better representation with multiple color gradations requires an advanced process, spatial anti-aliasing.

On continuous media, by contrast, no algorithm is necessary to draw a line. For example, cathode-ray oscilloscopes use analog phenomena to draw lines and curves.

List of line drawing algorithms 

The following is a partial list of line drawing algorithms:
 Naive algorithm
Digital Differential Analyzer (graphics algorithm) — Similar to the naive line-drawing algorithm, with minor variations.
Bresenham's line algorithm — optimized to use only additions (i.e. no division Multiplications); it also avoids floating-point computations.
Xiaolin Wu's line algorithm — can perform spatial anti-aliasing, appears "ropey" from brightness varying along the length of the line, though this effect may be greatly reduced by pre-compensating the pixel values for the target display's gamma curve, e.g. out = in ^ (1/2.4).
Gupta-Sproull algorithm

A naive line-drawing algorithm 
The simplest method of screening is the direct drawing of the equation defining the line.

 dx = x2 − x1
 dy = y2 − y1
 for x from x1 to x2 do
     y = y1 + dy × (x − x1) / dx
     plot(x, y)

It is  here that the points have already been ordered so that .

The naive line drawing algorithm is inefficient and thus, slow on a digital computer. Its inefficiency stems from the number of operations and the use of floating-point calculations. Algorithms such as Bresenham's line algorithm or Xiaolin Wu's line algorithm are preferred instead.

Gupta and Sproll algorithm 
The Gupta-Sproll algorithm is based on Bresenham's line algorithm but adds antialiasing.

An optimized variant of the Gupta-Sproull algorithm can be written in pseudocode as follows:

 DrawLine(x1, x2, y1, y2) {
     x = x1;
     y = y1;
     dx = x2 − x1;
     dy = y2 − y1;
     d = 2 * dy − dx; // discriminator
     
     // Euclidean distance of point (x,y) from line (signed)
     D = 0; 
     
     // Euclidean distance between points (x1, y1) and (x2, y2)
     length = sqrt(dx * dx + dy * dy); 
     
     sin = dx / length;     
     cos = dy / length;
     while (x <= x2) {
         IntensifyPixels(x, y − 1, D + cos);
         IntensifyPixels(x, y, D);
         IntensifyPixels(x, y + 1, D − cos);
         x = x + 1
         if (d <= 0) {
             D = D + sin;
             d = d + 2 * dy;
         } else {
             D = D + sin − cos;
             d = d + 2 * (dy − dx);
             y = y + 1;
         }
     }
 }

The IntensifyPixel(x,y,r) function takes a radial line transformation and sets the intensity of the pixel (x,y) with the value of a cubic polynomial that depends on the pixel's distance r from the line.

References 

 Fundamentals of Computer Graphics, 2nd Edition, A.K. Peters by Peter Shirley

Computer graphics algorithms